Ara Shiraz (June 8, 1941 – March 18, 2014) was an Armenian sculptor.  His mother and father were the poets Silva Kaputikyan and Hovhannes Shiraz.

Biography 
Ara Shiraz was born Aramazd Karapetyan in Yerevan in 1941. He graduated from the Institute of Fine Arts and Theatre of Yerevan in 1966. He participated in numerous exhibitions of young artists in Armenia and the Soviet Union. He was a member of the Painters Union of Armenia from 1968 until his death. His works have been exhibited in major cities of the U.S.S.R. (Moscow, Leningrad, Tbilisi) as part of solo and group shows. He took part in the Festival of Armenian Art "From Urartu to the Present" (Paris, 1970).

Shiraz was characterized by his monumental sculptural works. He was awarded the State Award of Armenia for his ornamental sculptures decorating the facade of the Dvin Hotel in Yerevan. In 1977 he was granted the title of Emeritus Artist of Armenia. In 1987 he was elected the president of the Artists' Union of Armenia, and a member of the Secretariat of the Artists' Union of the U.S.S.R.

In 2017, his works were displayed at the National Gallery of Armenia in an exhibition titled "Ara Shiraz: Retrospective".

Works 

Shiraz' most renowned works include the busts of Pablo Picasso, Yervand Kochar, Hovhannes Shiraz and Vruir Galstian. Many of his sculptural compositions are on permanent exhibit in the Modern Art Museum of Armenia, the State Gallery of Armenia, the Tretyakov Gallery and the Eastern Nations Museum of Art in Moscow.

Shiraz's paintings and sculptures are found in many private collections throughout the world: Moscow, St. Petersburg, Tbilisi, Yerevan, Beirut, Paris, London, New York City, Los Angeles, Chicago, Detroit and Montreal.

His works include:

 Yeghishe Charents, Charentsavan (1977)
Paruyr Sevak, Yerevan (1978)
 Aleksandr Miasnikian, Yerevan (1980)
 William Saroyan, Komitas Pantheon, Yerevan (1984)
Tigran Petrosian, Chess House, Yerevan (1989)
Hovhannes Shiraz, Komitas Pantheon (1989)
Sergei Parajanov, Komitas Pantheon (1999)
Andranik, Saint Gregory the Illumminator Cathedral (2002)
Hovhannes Shiraz, Malatia-Sebastia District, Yerevan (2005)
Vazgen I, Vaskenian Theological Academy, Sevan (2008)

Awards 

 Meritorious Artist of Armenia (1977)
 State Prize of Armenia (1979)
 RA President Award (2008)
 People’s Artist of Armenia (2009)

References

External Links 
 Ara Shiraz's biography
 azg.am

1941 births
2014 deaths
Artists from Yerevan
Armenian sculptors
20th-century Armenian sculptors